This is a list of heritage railway stations in the United Kingdom.

A

 

|}

B

|}

C

|}

D

|}

E

|}

F

|}

G

|}

H

|}

I

|}

J

|}

K

|}

L

 
 

|}

M

|}

N

 

|}

O

|}

P

|}

Q

|}

R

 

|}

S

|}

T

|}

U

|}

V

|}

W

|}

X

|}

Y

|}

Z

|}

Heritage
H